Lee Ledogo Maeba is a Nigerian politician who was elected senator for the Rivers State South East constituency on the People's Democratic Party (PDP) platform in April 2003, at age 37, and was reelected in April 2007. 
As of 15 March 2004, Maeba was a member of the Pan-African Parliament.
He was a member of the Committee on Trade, Customs and Immigration Matters, one of the Ten Permanent Committees of the Pan-African Parliament.

Maeba was born in February 1966. He obtained a BSc Degree in Technology from University of Science and Technology, Port Harcourt. Before becoming a senator he was a justice of the peace and a state party vice chairman.
He is married to Mrs. Aya Maeba, who also is from a family of politicians. In a May 2009 survey of senatorial performance in the 6th National Assembly, ThisDay noted that he had sponsored several bills related to oil exploitation, and gave him an "average" rating.

References

Living people
Members of the Pan-African Parliament from Nigeria
Members of the Senate (Nigeria) from Rivers State
Peoples Democratic Party members of the Senate (Nigeria)
1966 births
Rivers State Peoples Democratic Party politicians
Rivers State University alumni
Nigerian Christians
21st-century Nigerian politicians